The Dove (De Düva) is a 1968 Oscar-nominated American short film that parodies the films of Swedish director Ingmar Bergman.

Background
The film borrows heavily from the plot lines of some of Bergman's most famous films. There is a journey by car back to the location of childhood memories as in Wild Strawberries. The main characters meet with the shrouded figure of Death as in The Seventh Seal. The film was directed by George Coe and Anthony Lover. Madeline Kahn made her first film appearance, in a supporting role. The dialogue and voice-over narration are spoken mostly in a heavily accented fictional language, which is mostly English made to sound like Swedish, with many of the nouns ending in "ska". (For example, the subtitled word "eventually" is spoken in dialogue as "sooner or lateska".) There are also a smattering of Yiddish words. The film often was shown in repertory film houses as a short feature when Bergman films were on the bill; audiences frequently did not realize that the short was a comedy until individuals started laughing when they began to understand the fake Swedish. The subtitles, which often do not literally match the dialogue, add to the humor.

Plot
Victor, a 76-year-old physics professor traveling by chauffeured car to give a university lecture, decides to visit his boyhood home. In the outhouse, he finds a figurine of a dove that reminds him of a summer picnic from his youth. Later in the flashback, Victor (played by Coe) and his beloved sister Inga run through the woods until they come across Death, who has come to claim Inga. Victor wagers that Death will not win a badmintonska (badminton) competition with Inga—parodying The Seventh Seal, in which the competition is a game of chess. Death agrees, with the condition that if he wins he will take both Inga and Victor. After Inga wins the competition, thanks in whole or in part to the accidental bird droppings of the Dove, she and Victor happily run to the lake to go skinny-dipping.

Notes

References

External links
 
 The Dove on YouTube

1968 films
American parody films
American short films
Fictional-language films
Ingmar Bergman
Films about personifications of death
1960s English-language films
1960s American films
1968 independent films
American independent films